A mental health trust provides health and social care services for people with mental health disorders in England.

There are 54 mental health trusts. They are commissioned and funded by clinical commissioning groups.

Patients usually access the services of mental health trusts through their GP (primary care medical doctor) or via a stay in hospital. Most of the services are for people who live in the region, although there may be specialist services for the whole of the UK or services that accept national referrals. Mental Health Trusts may or may not provide inpatient psychiatric hospital services themselves (they may form part of a general hospital run by a hospital trust). The various trusts work together and with local authorities and voluntary organisations to provide care.

Services 
Services provided by mental health trusts vary but typically include:
 Counselling sessions - one-to-one or in a group
 Courses - such as on how to deal with stress, anger, and bereavement. Courses may also be available for carers of those with mental health disorders
 Resources - such as leaflets and books on mental health issues
 Psychotherapy - treatment sessions with a therapist. Commonly cognitive behavioural therapy
 Family support - providing support to the family, friends, and carers of those with a mental health problem.
 Community drug and alcohol clinics - helping people to cope with addiction
 Community mental health houses - supported housing to help people live in the community
 Day hospitals and day centres - short-term outpatient sessions with a psychiatrist, clinical psychologist or other mental health professional, and drop-in centres for peer support and therapeutic activities.

If more specialist hospital treatment is required, Mental Health Trusts will help with rehabilitation back into the community (social inclusion). Trusts may operate community mental health teams, which may include Crisis Resolution and Home Treatment, assertive outreach and early intervention services.

The Mental Health Act 1983, Mental Health Act 2007 and Mental Capacity Act 2005 cover the rights, assessment and treatment of people diagnosed with a mental disorder who are judged as requiring to be detained ("sectioned") or treated against their will. A mental health trust will typically have a Mental Health Act team responsible for ensuring that the Act is administered correctly, including to protect the rights of inpatients, or of service users in the community who may now be under community treatment orders. The Care Quality Commission is the body with overall national responsibility for inspecting and regulating the operation of the mental health act by the regional trusts.

Capacity
According to the British Medical Association the number of beds for psychiatric patients was reduced by 44% between 2001 and 2017. An average of 726 mental health patients were placed in institutions away from their home area in 2016.

Children of school age are normally treated through Child and Adolescent Mental Health Services (CAMHS), usually organised by local government area. Young people who become psychiatric in-patients frequently are treated in adult wards due to lack of beds in wards that are suitable for people of their ages.  Young people frequently stay in hospital wards when they are fit for discharge because the mental health support facilities they need are not available where they live.

List of MHTs 

These are the mental health trusts in the NHS in England in 2017 (note that many have NHS Foundation Trust status – a type of trust that has more independence from government):
 2gether NHS Foundation Trust
 5 Boroughs Partnership NHS Foundation Trust 
 Avon and Wiltshire Mental Health Partnership NHS Trust
 Barnet, Enfield and Haringey Mental Health NHS Trust
 Berkshire Healthcare NHS Foundation Trust
 Birmingham and Solihull Mental Health NHS Foundation Trust
 Bradford District Care Trust
 Cambridgeshire and Peterborough NHS Foundation Trust
 Camden and Islington NHS Foundation Trust
 Central and North West London NHS Foundation Trust
 Cheshire and Wirral Partnership NHS Foundation Trust
 Cornwall Partnership NHS Foundation Trust
 Coventry and Warwickshire Partnership NHS Trust
 Cumbria, Northumberland, Tyne and Wear NHS Foundation Trust
 Derbyshire Healthcare NHS Foundation Trust
 Devon Partnership NHS Trust
 Dorset HealthCare University NHS Foundation Trust
 Dudley and Walsall Mental Health Partnership NHS Trust
 East London NHS Foundation Trust
 Greater Manchester Mental Health NHS Foundation Trust
 Humber NHS Foundation Trust
 Isle of Wight NHS Trust
 Kent and Medway NHS and Social Care Partnership Trust
 Lancashire Care NHS Foundation Trust
 Leeds and York Partnership NHS Foundation Trust
 Leicestershire Partnership NHS Trust
 Lincolnshire Partnership NHS Foundation Trust
 Mersey Care NHS Trust
 Norfolk and Suffolk NHS Foundation Trust
 North East London NHS Foundation Trust
 North Essex Partnership University NHS Foundation Trust
 North Staffordshire Combined Healthcare NHS Trust
 Northamptonshire Healthcare NHS Foundation Trust
 North Cumbria Integrated Care NHS Foundation Trust
 Nottinghamshire Healthcare NHS Foundation Trust
 Oxford Health NHS Foundation Trust
 Oxleas NHS Foundation Trust
 Pennine Care NHS Foundation Trust
 Rotherham Doncaster and South Humber NHS Foundation Trust
 Sheffield Health & Social Care NHS Foundation Trust
 Somerset Partnership NHS Foundation Trust
 South Essex Partnership University NHS Foundation Trust
 South London and Maudsley NHS Foundation Trust 
 South Staffordshire and Shropshire Healthcare NHS Foundation Trust
 South West London and St George's Mental Health NHS Trust
 South West Yorkshire Partnership NHS Foundation Trust
 Southern Health NHS Foundation Trust
 Surrey and Borders Partnership NHS Foundation Trust
 Sussex Partnership NHS Foundation Trust 
 Tavistock and Portman NHS Foundation Trust
 Tees, Esk and Wear Valleys NHS Trust
 West London NHS Trust
 Worcestershire Health and Care NHS Trust

See also

National Mental Health Development Unit
:Category:NHS mental health trusts

References

National Health Service (England)